This is a full list of the mammals native to the U.S. state of New York.

The following tags are used to highlight each species' conservation status as assessed by the International Union for Conservation of Nature:

Opossums, order Didelphimorphia
Didelphimorphia is the order of common opossums of the Western Hemisphere. Opossums probably diverged from the basic South American marsupials in the late Cretaceous or early Paleocene. The Virginia opossum is the only marsupial/opossum species in New York.

Family Didelphidae (American opossums)
Subfamily: Didelphinae
Genus: Didelphis
 Virginia opossum, D. virginiana

Insectivores, order Eulipotyphla
Eulipotyphlans are insectivorous mammals. Shrews closely resemble mice, while moles are stout-bodied burrowers.

Family Soricidae (shrews)
Genus: Blarina
 Northern short-tailed shrew B. brevicauda 
Genus: Cryptotis
 North American least shrew C. parva 
Genus: Sorex
 Masked shrew S. cinereus 
 Long-tailed shrew S. dispar 
 Smoky shrew S. fumeus 
 American pygmy shrew S. hoyi 
 American water shrew S. palustris 

Family Talpidae (moles)
Genus: Condylura
 Star-nosed mole, C. cristata 
Genus: Parascalops
 Hairy-tailed mole, P. breweri 
Genus: Scalopus
 Eastern mole, S. aquaticus

Lagomorphs, order Lagomorpha
Though lagomorphs can resemble rodents, and were classified as a superfamily in that order until the early 20th century, they have since been considered a separate order. They differ from rodents in a number of physical characteristics, such as having four incisors in the upper jaw rather than two.
Family Leporidae (rabbits and hares)
Genus: Lepus
Snowshoe hare, L. americanus 
European hare, L. europaeus  introduced
Genus: Sylvilagus
Eastern cottontail, S. floridanus 
New England cottontail, S. transitionalis

Rodents, order Rodentia
Rodents make up the largest order of mammals, with over 40% of mammalian species. They have two incisors in the upper and lower jaw which grow continually, and must be kept short by gnawing.

Family Castoridae (beavers)
Genus: Castor
North American beaver, C. canadensis 

Family Cricetidae (New World mice, rats, voles, lemmings, muskrats)
Genus: Microtus
Rock vole, M. chrotorrhinus 
Meadow vole, M. pennsylvanicus 
Gull Island vole, M. p. nesophilus 
Woodland vole, M. pinetorum 
Genus: Myodes
Southern red-backed vole, M. gapperi 
Genus: Neotoma
Allegheny woodrat, N. magister  extirpated
Genus: Ondatra
Muskrat, O. zibethicus 
Genus: Peromyscus
White-footed mouse, P. leucopus 
Eastern deermouse, P. maniculatus 
Genus: Synaptomys
Northern bog lemming, S. borealis  vagrant
Southern bog lemming, S. cooperi 
Family Dipodidae (jumping mice)
Genus: Napaeozapus
Woodland jumping mouse, N. insignis 
Genus: Zapus
Meadow jumping mouse, Z. hudsonius 

Family Erethizontidae (New World porcupines)
Genus: Erethizon
North American porcupine, E. dorsatum 

Family Muridae (Old World mice and rats)
Genus: Mus
House mouse, M. musculus  introduced
Genus: Rattus
Norway rat, R. norvegicus  introduced
Black rat, R. rattus  introduced
Family Sciuridae (squirrels)
Genus: Glaucomys
Northern flying squirrel, G. sabrinus 
Southern flying squirrel, G. volans 
Genus: Marmota
Groundhog, M. monax 
Genus: Sciurus
Eastern gray squirrel, S. carolinensis 
Fox squirrel, S. niger 
Genus: Tamias
Eastern chipmunk, T. striatus 
Genus: Tamiasciurus
American red squirrel, T. hudsonicus

Bats, order Chiroptera
The bats' most distinguishing feature is that their forelimbs are developed as wings, making them the only mammals capable of flight. Bat species account for about 20% of all mammals.

Family Vespertilionidae (vesper bats)
Genus: Aeorestes
Hoary bat, A. cinereus 
Genus: Eptesicus
Big brown bat, E. fuscus 
Genus: Lasionycteris
Silver-haired bat, L. noctivagans 
Genus: Lasiurus
Eastern red bat, L. borealis 
Seminole bat, L. seminolus 
Genus: Myotis
Eastern small-footed bat, M. leibii 
Little brown bat, M. lucifugus 
Northern long-eared bat, M. septentrionalis 
Indiana bat, M. sodalis  
Genus: Perimyotis
Tricolored bat, P. subflavus

Carnivores, order Carnivora
There are over 260 species of carnivorans, the majority of which feed primarily on meat. They have a characteristic skull shape and dentition.

Family Canidae (canids)
Genus: Canis
 Coyote, C. latrans 
Eastern coyote, C. l. ssp.
Eastern wolf, C. lycaon extirpated
Red wolf, C. rufus  extirpated
Genus: Urocyon
Gray fox, U. cinereoargenteus 
Genus: Vulpes
Red fox, V. vulpes 
Family Procyonidae (raccoons)
Genus: Procyon
Common raccoon, P. lotor 

Family Ursidae (bears)
Genus: Ursus
American black bear, U. americanus 

Family Felidae (cats)
Genus: Lynx
Canada lynx, L. canadensis  extirpated
Bobcat, L. rufus 
Genus: Puma
Cougar, P. concolor  extirpated
Eastern cougar, P. c. couguar 

Family Mustelidae (weasels, minks, martens, fishers, and otters)
Genus: Gulo
Wolverine, G. gulo  extirpated
Genus: Lontra
North American river otter, L. canadensis 
Genus: Martes
American marten, M. americana 
Genus: Mustela
Least weasel, M. nivalis 
American ermine, M. richardsonii 
Genus: Neogale
Long-tailed weasel, N. frenata 
American mink, N. vison  
Genus: Pekania
Fisher, P. pennanti  
Genus: Taxidea
American badger, T. taxus  

Family Mephitidae (skunks)
Genus: Mephitis
Striped skunk, M. mephitis 
Family Phocidae (seals)
Genus: Halichoerus
Gray seal, H. grypus 
Genus: Pagophilus
Harp seal, P. groenlandicus 
Genus: Phoca
Harbor seal, P. vitulina 
Genus: Pusa
Ringed seal, P. hispida

Even-toed ungulates, order Artiodactyla
The even-toed ungulates are ungulates whose weight is borne about equally by the third and fourth toes, rather than mostly or entirely by the third as in perissodactyls.

Family Cervidae (deer)
Genus: Alces
Moose, A. alces  
Eastern moose, A. a. americana
Genus: Cervus
Elk, C. canadensis  extirpated
Eastern elk, C. c. canadensis 
Genus: Odocoileus
White-tailed deer, O. virginianus  
Genus: Rangifer
Caribou R. tarandus  extirpated
Boreal woodland caribou R. t. caribou extirpated
 
Family Bovidae (bovids)
Genus: Bison
American bison, B. bison  extirpated
Family Suidae (pigs)
Genus: Sus
Wild boar, S. scrofa  introduced, extirpated

Cetaceans, order Cetacea
Cetaceans are the mammals most fully adapted to aquatic life with a spindle-shaped nearly hairless body, protected by a thick layer of blubber, and forelimbs and tail modified to provide propulsion underwater.
Family Balaenidae (right whales)
Genus: Balaena
Bowhead whale, B. mysticetus 
Genus: Eubalaena
North Atlantic right whale, E. glacialis 
Family Balaenopteridae (rorquals)
Genus: Balaenoptera
Common minke whale, B. acutorostrata 
Sei whale, B. borealis 
Blue whale, B. musculus 
Fin whale, B. physalus 
Genus: Megaptera
Humpback whale, M. novaeangliae 
Family Kogiidae (false sperm whales)
Genus: Kogia
Pygmy sperm whale, K. breviceps 
Dwarf sperm whale, K. sima 
Family Physeteridae (sperm whales)
Genus: Physeter
Sperm whale, P. macrocephalus 
Family Ziphiidae (beaked whales)
Genus: Hyperoodon
Northern bottlenose whale, H. ampullatus 
Genus: Mesoplodon
Sowerby's beaked whale, M. bidens 
Blainville's beaked whale, M. densirostris 
Gervais' beaked whale, M. europaeus 
True's beaked whale, M. mirus 
Genus: Ziphius
Cuvier's beaked whale, Z. cavirostris 
Family Monodontinae (narwhal and beluga)
Genus: Delphinapterus
Beluga whale, D. leucas  vagrant
Family Delphinidae (dolphins)
Genus: Delphinus
Short-beaked common dolphin, D. delphis 
Genus: Globicephala
Short-finned pilot whale, G. macrorhynchus 
Long-finned pilot whale, G. melas 
Genus: Grampus
Risso's dolphin, G. griseus 
Genus: Lagenorhynchus
Atlantic white-sided dolphin, L. acutus 
Genus: Orcinus
Orca, O. orca 
Genus: Stenella
Clymene dolphin, S. clymene 
Striped dolphin, S. coeruleoalba 
Atlantic spotted dolphin, S. frontalis 
Spinner dolphin, S. longirostris 
Genus: Tursiops
Common bottlenose dolphin, T. truncatus 
Family Phocoenidae (porpoises)
Genus: Phocoena
Harbor porpoise, P. phocoena

See also
 Seneca white deer
 Rats in New York City

References

New York
Mammals